Jamaat-e-Islami may refer to :

 Jamaat-e-Islami, an Islamic political party;
 Jamaat-e-Islami Pakistan, a political party of Pakistan;
 Bangladesh Jamaat-e-Islami, a political party based in Bangladesh;
 Jamaat-e-Islami Hind, a political party based in India;
 Jamaat-e-Islami Kashmir, an Islamic organisation based in Kashmir;
 Jamiat-e Islami, an Islamic political party of Afghanistan.

See also
 Al-Jama'a al-Islamiyya (disambiguation)